Ambroise Garin (10 May 1875, Arviers – 31 March 1969) was an Italian-born French  professional bicycle racer.

Garin competed as a professional cyclist from 1899–1903, and lived at Argenteuil, Val-d'Oise until his death at the age of 93.

His best results were:  Paris-Roubaix 1899 3rd, 1901 2nd, 1902 3rd;  Bordeaux – Paris 1900 3rd, 1902 3rd.

His brothers Maurice and César were also professional bicycle racers.

Notes 

1875 births
1969 deaths
French male cyclists
Italian emigrants to France
Cyclists from Aosta Valley
Italian male cyclists